Kul Kandi (also Romanized as Kūl Kandī) is a village in Ahmadfedaleh Rural District, Sardasht District, Dezful County, Khuzestan Province, Iran. At the 2006 census, its population was 84, in 12 families.

References 

Populated places in Dezful County